Railway stations in Tanzania include:

Tanzania Standard Gauge Railway

Maps 
 UN Map - Tanga and Kidatu lines not shown.
 Railways in southern Africa
 Official map
 UNHCR Map
 Interactive map of Tanzania railways
 Look for the MSN Map at the bottom of pages of many towns, or look for the Map Button at the top and scroll down the MSN map.

Towns served by rail

Tanzania Railways Corporation 
( all  gauge)

Central Line 

 Dar es Salaam - ocean port - former national capital - 8 km from TAZARA line 
 Ruvu (75m) - junction to Tanga line
 Morogoro (510m) - junction to north
 Kilosa (572m) - junction going south to TAZARA
 Gulwe (680m)
 Igandu (985m)
 Dodoma (1148m) - The national capital
 Manyoni (1244m) - junction going north to Singida 
 Itigi (1306m)
 Ikungu (1289m)
 Tabora (1212m) - junction going north to Mwanza
 Kaliua (1112m) - junction going south to Mpanda
 Kigoma (775m) - terminal and port on Lake Tanganyika

Kidatu Line 
 (Not shown on map)
 Kilosa (572m) - junction
 Kidatu (294m) - branch terminus - also served with break of gauge by TAZARA, with a container trans-shipment facility to move freight containers between TAZARA and Tanzania Railways Corporation trains

Mwanza Line 
 Tabora (1212m) - junction
 Bukene (1188m)
 Isaka (1197m) - 'dry port' and proposed junction for lines to Rwanda and Burundi
 Shinyanga (1126m)
 Mwanza (1209m) - inland port on Lake Victoria

Mpanda Line 
 Kaliua (1112m) - junction
 Mpanda (1074m) - branch terminus

Singida Line 

 Manyoni (1244m) - junction
 Issuna (1423m)
 Ikungi (1532m)
 Puma
 Singida (1122m) - branch terminus

Link Line 

 Morogoro (510m) - junction with Central Line
 Ruvu (75m)
 Kitonga (65m)
 Sadani (1m)
 Hale (184m) - junction
 Korogwe (301m) - junction with Tanga Line

Tanga line 
 Tanga (1m) - ocean port
 Korogwe (301m) - junction to south
 Mkomazi (485m)
 Same (897m)
 Moshi (990m) - junction to north and Kenya
 Arusha (1254m) - soda ash mining

Proposed extensions 

 September 2007 
 Arusha (1254m) 
 Musoma (1172m) on Lake Victoria.

 Tanga
 Mwambani Bay

 ( gauge)
 Tanga
 Singida
  Mutukula, Tanzania
  Mutukula, Uganda
 Kampala

 (branch)
 Mutukula
 Musoma - Lake Victoria port

Standard Gauge 
 Dar es Salaam
 Pugu (19 km)
 Soga (51 km)
 Ruvu (74 km) - junction on old line only.
 Freight Yard (93 km)
 Ngerengere (135 km)
 Morogoro (205 km) - end stage one - work started in April 2017.
 Dodoma - capital
 Makutupora - (336 km from previous station)
 Tabora - (294 km)
 Isaka - (133 km) - inland dry port
 Mwanza - (249 km) - port city on Lake Victoria
 Kigoma on Lake Tanganyika

Mtwara Line (Southern Province Railway) - (defunct) 
In 1949 a line was built to link the Tanganyika groundnut scheme plantations around Nachingwea with the port of Mtwara.  The scheme famously foundered and the railway was abandoned in 1962.  Proposals have been made for a new railway to link Mtwara to iron ore deposits in the west, perhaps linking via Songea to Liganga.

Island of Unguja 

A short  line lasted from 1879 to 1888.

Mtwara (rebuilt) 

 Mtwara (1 m) - port for groundnut scheme
 Lindi (1 m) - potential port 
 Nachingwea (380 m) groundnut scheme terminus
 Mchuchuma (m) - coal
 Songea
 Liganga (1210 m) - iron ore

TAZARA Railway 

Formerly also called TanZam Railway.

 gauge to match Zambian/Southern African networks.

 Dar es Salaam - ocean port -  8 km from TRC line 
 Mzenga (137 m)
 Kisaki (292 m)
 Kidatu (294 m) - break of gauge connection with Tanzania Railways Corporation, with a container trans-shipment facility to move freight containers between TAZARA and Tanzania Railways Corporation trains. on short branch.
 Mang'ula
 Kiberege
 Ifakara (192 m)
 Lwipa
 Mbingu
 Mngeta
 Chita
 Mlimba
 Makambako
 Chimala                                                                                      
 Mbeya (1661 m) - workshops
 Mbozi
 Vwawa (1274 m)
  Tunduma, Tanzania (1301 m)
   - Tanzania / Zambian border
  Mkushi, Zambia (1277 m)

 Mbeya possible junction
 Kasanga

Rehabilitation 

 North-South Corridor Project

Gauge 

But if you have 4-rail gauge, then you can include  gauge (standard gauge) at the cost of slightly longer sleepers.

Container port 

The container port at Dar es Salaam is served by both  and  railway gauge tracks.

See also 

 History of rail transport in Tanzania
 Rail transport in Tanzania
 Railway stations in Kenya
 Railway stations in Zambia
 Railway stations in Rwanda
 Railway stations in Burundi
 Railway stations in Uganda
 Tanzania Railways Corporation
 Dual gauge

References 

 
Railway stations
Railway stations